Ezra Nathan Sellers (September 2, 1968 – December 12, 2013) was an American cruiserweight boxer. He lived in Pensacola, Florida, where he died on December 12, 2013, due to heart problems.

Sellers won the world IBO cruiserweight championship against Carl Thompson; however, his title was vacated after losing to WBO champion Johnny Nelson on April 6, 2002 in Copenhagen, Denmark, who declined the IBO belt.

He was inducted into the Florida Boxing Hall of Fame in 2013.

Professional boxing record

|-
|align="center" colspan=8|29 Wins (26 knockouts, 3 decisions), 8 Losses (8 knockouts, 0 decisions) 
|-
| align="center" style="border-style: none none solid solid; background: #e3e3e3"|Result
| align="center" style="border-style: none none solid solid; background: #e3e3e3"|Record
| align="center" style="border-style: none none solid solid; background: #e3e3e3"|Opponent
| align="center" style="border-style: none none solid solid; background: #e3e3e3"|Type
| align="center" style="border-style: none none solid solid; background: #e3e3e3"|Round
| align="center" style="border-style: none none solid solid; background: #e3e3e3"|Date
| align="center" style="border-style: none none solid solid; background: #e3e3e3"|Location
| align="center" style="border-style: none none solid solid; background: #e3e3e3"|Notes
|-align=center
|Loss
|
|align=left| Emmanuel Nwodo
|KO
|2
|19 Jan 2008
|align=left| New York City, New York, U.S.
|align=left|
|-
|Win
|
|align=left| Kenny Craven
|TKO
|3
|7 Dec 2007
|align=left| Biloxi, Mississippi, U.S.
|align=left|
|-
|Win
|
|align=left| Troy Beets
|TKO
|6
|14 Jul 2007
|align=left| Biloxi, Mississippi, U.S.
|align=left|
|-
|Loss
|
|align=left| O'Neil Bell
|KO
|2
|4 Sep 2004
|align=left| Paradise, Nevada, U.S.
|align=left|
|-
|Loss
|
|align=left| Kelvin Davis
|TKO
|8
|1 May 2004
|align=left| Miami, Florida, U.S.
|align=left|
|-
|Win
|
|align=left| Joseph Awinongya
|UD
|8
|28 Jun 2003
|align=left| Coconut Creek, Florida, U.S.
|align=left|
|-
|Win
|
|align=left| Jason Robinson
|TKO
|2
|1 Mar 2003
|align=left| Paradise, Nevada, U.S.
|align=left|
|-
|Win
|
|align=left| Kevin Tallon
|TKO
|1
|7 Sep 2002
|align=left| Portland, Oregon, U.S.
|align=left|
|-
|Loss
|
|align=left| Johnny Nelson
|KO
|8
|6 Apr 2002
|align=left| Copenhagen, Denmark
|align=left|
|-
|Win
|
|align=left| Carl Thompson
|KO
|4
|26 Nov 2001
|align=left| Manchester, England
|align=left|
|-
|Win
|
|align=left| Onebo Maxime
|KO
|2
|20 Jun 2001
|align=left| Kenner, Louisiana, U.S.
|align=left|
|-
|Loss
|
|align=left| Ramon Garbey
|TKO
|1
|17 May 2001
|align=left| Biloxi, Mississippi, U.S.
|align=left|
|-
|Win
|
|align=left| Sidney Mack
|TKO
|1
|29 Jul 2000
|align=left| Tunica, Mississippi, U.S.
|align=left|
|-
|Win
|
|align=left| Willard Lewis
|TKO
|3
|1 Apr 2000
|align=left| Atlantic City, New Jersey, U.S.
|align=left|
|-
|Win
|
|align=left| Drexie James
|TKO
|8
|25 Feb 2000
|align=left| Tunica, Mississippi, U.S.
|align=left|
|-
|Win
|
|align=left| Nestor Hipolito Giovannini
|TKO
|1
|29 Jan 2000
|align=left| Atlantic City, New Jersey, U.S.
|align=left|
|-
|Win
|
|align=left| Matt Green
|UD
|8
|10 Dec 1999
|align=left| Biloxi, Mississippi, U.S.
|align=left|
|-
|Win
|
|align=left| Miguel Angel Medina Burgos
|TKO
|6
|19 Nov 1999
|align=left| Tunica, Mississippi, U.S.
|align=left|
|-
|Win
|
|align=left| Danny Wofford
|TKO
|4
|15 Jan 1999
|align=left| Lake Worth, Florida, U.S.
|align=left|
|-
|Loss
|
|align=left| Alex Stewart
|TKO
|3
|8 Oct 1998
|align=left| Kansas City, Missouri, U.S.
|align=left|
|-
|Win
|
|align=left| Marion Wilson
|UD
|10
|12 Jun 1998
|align=left| Baton Rouge, Louisiana, U.S.
|align=left|
|-
|Win
|
|align=left| John McClain
|TKO
|1
|7 Aug 1997
|align=left| Mashantucket, Connecticut, U.S.
|align=left|
|-
|Win
|
|align=left| Ken McCurdy
|KO
|1
|22 Nov 1996
|align=left| Tampa, Florida, U.S.
|align=left|
|-
|Win
|
|align=left| Artis Pendergrass
|TKO
|10
|11 Sep 1996
|align=left| Pensacola, Florida, U.S.
|align=left|
|-
|Win
|
|align=left| Earl Talley
|TKO
|1
|15 Jun 1996
|align=left| Jacksonville, Florida, U.S.
|align=left|
|-
|Win
|
|align=left| Mike Pearman
|TKO
|3
|18 Apr 1996
|align=left| Tulsa, Oklahoma, U.S.
|align=left|
|-
|Win
|
|align=left| George Barlow
|TKO
|1
|28 Mar 1996
|align=left| Pensacola, Florida, U.S.
|align=left|
|-
|Win
|
|align=left| James Fernandez
|KO
|1
|8 Dec 1995
|align=left| Pensacola, Florida, U.S.
|align=left|
|-
|Win
|
|align=left| Richie Brown
|TKO
|4
|24 Jun 1995
|align=left| Atlantic City, New Jersey, U.S.
|align=left|
|-
|Win
|
|align=left| Tom Williams
|TKO
|1
|18 Mar 1995
|align=left| Pensacola, Florida, U.S.
|align=left|
|-
|Win
|
|align=left| Gary Butler
|TKO
|1
|20 Sep 1994
|align=left| Pensacola, Florida, U.S.
|align=left|
|-
|Win
|
|align=left| Rick Willis
|TKO
|1
|22 Mar 1994
|align=left| Pensacola, Florida, U.S.
|align=left|
|-
|Loss
|
|align=left| Ed Thompson
|TKO
|4
|7 Jun 1993
|align=left| Winston-Salem, North Carolina, U.S.
|align=left|
|-
|Win
|
|align=left| Dayton Wheeler
|KO
|3
|12 Feb 1993
|align=left| Bushkill, Pennsylvania, U.S.
|align=left|
|-
|Win
|
|align=left| Richard McComber
|TKO
|1
|15 Sep 1992
|align=left| Fort Lauderdale, Florida, U.S.
|align=left|
|-
|Win
|
|align=left| Frankie Hines
|KO
|3
|21 Mar 1992
|align=left| Winston-Salem, North Carolina, U.S.
|align=left|
|-
|Loss
|
|align=left| Bruce Seldon
|TKO
|2
|22 Aug 1989
|align=left| Atlantic City, New Jersey, U.S.
|align=left|
|}

References

External links

1968 births
2013 deaths
Boxers from Washington, D.C.
Cruiserweight boxers
Southpaw boxers
American male boxers
African-American boxers